Attilio Anelli-Monti (10 June 1854 – 13 February 1924) was an Italian artist. He was the director of the Società Musiva Veneziana between 1884 and 1913.

Bibliography 
 Annuario del Corriere Fotografico, 1912, 1914, Milan, Italy;
 Agazzi Augusto, Il mosaico in Italia, Hoepli, Milan, Italy 1926;
 M. Farnetti, Glossario Tecnico Storico del Mosaico;
 Federazione Fascista autonoma degli Artigiani d'Italia, La rinascita del mosaico a Venezia, Venice, Italy 1913;
 Societa' Musiva Veneziana, I mosaici della societa' Musiva Veneziana all'Esposizione Nazionale di Torino, Tipografia Tischer & C, Venice, Italy 1880;
 Elio Varutti, Anelli-Monti e Anderloni, Ribis Editore, Udine, Italy 1994;
 Private Collection Carlo Anelli-Monti, Belluno, Italy;
 Archivio Sandro Tischer, Saronno - Varese, Italy.
 E. Alessi, E. Anelli-Monti, E. Pezzutto e S. Zanatta, Ricerca Storica su palazzo Ca'Bernardo in calle Bernardo sestiere di San Polo Venezia, Venice, Italy 1999.

References

External links 
 :it:Società Musiva Veneziana
 Biblioteche in Polo   Anelli-Monti e Anderloni

1854 births
1924 deaths
Artists from Venice